Basari, or Oniyan (Onian, Onëyan, Ayan, Biyan, Wo), is a Senegambian language of Senegal and Guinea spoken by the Bassari people.

Writing system 

This is the writing system of Senegal:

 ĥ, ŵ, ŷ, or h̃, w̃, ỹ are the consonants h, w, y nasalised.
 When vowels e and o are open, they have the acute accent: é, ó.

This is the writing system of Guinea, which uses the Guinean languages alphabet:

References

External links
 Decree No. 2005-987 of 21 October 2005 relating to the spelling and the separation of words in Oniyan via the website of the Senegalese Journal officiel 

Fula–Tenda languages
Languages of Guinea
Languages of Senegal